Little House on the Prairie is a 1974 American made-for-television film which served as the pilot to the Little House on the Prairie TV series on NBC. It is closely based on the Little House on the Prairie novel; second of the "Little House" series of books by Laura Ingalls Wilder. The pilot was produced by Ed Friendly with the script written by Blanche Hanalis and directed by Michael Landon.

Plot
The movie starts with the Ingalls family leaving their little house in the Big Woods and starting west. After a long and adventurous journey, they stop in Indian Country. Charles builds a house and starts farming,  Indians visit them, and they meet Mr. Edwards. After a year, soldiers come and tell  the family they have to leave. After packing everything they own, they set off  on a new journey.

Cast
Melissa Gilbert as Laura Ingalls
Michael Landon as Charles Ingalls
Karen Grassle as Caroline Ingalls
Melissa Sue Anderson as Mary Ingalls
Lindsay and Sidney Greenbush as Carrie Ingalls
Victor French as Isaiah Edwards 
 Victor Mohica as Soldat Du Chêne 
 Cal Bellini as Brave 
 Sam Vlahos as 1st Indian 
 Richard Alarian as 2nd Indian 
 Marian Beeler as Charlotte Holbrook
John Steadman as Frederick Holbrook
 Ruth Foster as Aunt Ruby (uncredited)

Production notes
Filmed in early 1973 near Stockton, California.
First broadcast March 30, 1974
Broadcast in the series' first season on September 11, 1974

References

External links
 
 
Ed Friendly’s Life and Legacy
About Blanche Hanalis
About Michael Landon

Little House on the Prairie (TV series)
Films based on children's books
American biographical films
American television films
Films directed by Michael Landon
Television films as pilots
1974 television films
1974 films
1974 drama films
1974 Western (genre) films
NBC Productions films
1970s American films

pl:Lista odcinków serialu Domek na prerii#Filmy telewizyjne